The 1976 Copa Libertadores Finals was the final two-legged tie to determine the 1976 Copa Libertadores champion. It was contested by Argentine club River Plate and Brazilian club Cruzeiro Esporte Clube. The first leg of the tie was played on 21 July at Cruzeiro' home field, with the second leg played on 28 July at River'. Cruzeiro and Boca Juniors played in their 1st Copa Libertadores finals.

Cruzeiro won the series after winning a tie-breaking playoff 3–2 at Santiago's Estadio Nacional, with the winning goal by Joaozinho being scored by the end of the match.

Qualified teams

Stadiums

Rules
The finals were played over two legs; home and away. The team that accumulated the most points —two for a win, one for a draw, zero for a loss— after the two legs would be crowned the champion. In case of two teams tied on points after the second leg a playoff at a neutral venue would be played to crown a champion, with goal difference used as a last resort.

Route to the Finals
Cruzeiro qualified to the 1976 Copa Libertadores as the 1975 Copa Brasil runners-up, defeated by Internacional 1-0 in the final match. River Plate qualified as champions of both 1975 Metropolitano and 1975 Nacional.

Group stage

River Plate was drawn into Group 1 alongside Estudiantes de La Plata, runners-up of the 1975 Metropolitano Championship, and Venezuelan sides Portuguesa and Deportivo Galicia. The millonarios cruised to the Semifinals after winning five of six matches, and losing just one. River won the three matches played at your home ground, scoring seven goals and suffering just two. River also won the two matches in Venezuela, against Portuguesa and Deportivo Galicia, by 2-0 and 1-0 respectively. The only defeat was against Estudiantes, in La Plata, by 0-1.

Cruzeiro was drawn into Group 3. They were joined by fellow Brazilian club Internacional and Paraguayan outfits Olimpia and Sportivo Luqueño. Like River Plate, Cruzeiro made a campaign with five wins in six matches, with the difference that the Brazilian club tied a game instead of losing. Cruzeiro won the three matches played at your home ground scoring thirteen goals and suffering six. Cruzeiro also won Internacional in Porto Alegre and Sportivo Luqueño in Luque, but tied 2-2 against Olimpia in Asunción.

Semi-finals

The Semifinals round was another group phase. Cruzeiro were drown in Group 1 alongside LDU Quito and Alianza Lima. This time, Cruzeiro won all their four matches including the historic 7-1 drubbing against Alianza Lima. It was the first game after the death of striker Roberto Batata, killed in an automobile accident. To honor his companion, players of Cruzeiro scored seven goals, which is the number of the shirt that was worn by Batata. Cruzeiro advanced to the finals with a 100% success.

In the Semifinals, River Plate played against defending champions Independiente and the Uruguayan club Peñarol. The two Argentine clubs finished tied on stage five points apiece, necessitating a playoff, where River Plate won Independiente by 1-0.

Matches

First leg

|}

Second leg

|}

Playoff

References

1976 in South American football
Copa Libertadores Finals
Club Atlético River Plate matches
Cruzeiro Esporte Clube matches
Copa
Copa
Football in Buenos Aires